Barbara Kent (née Cloutman; December 16, 1907 – October 13, 2011) was a Canadian film actress, prominent from the silent film era to the early talkies of the 1920s and 1930s. In 1925, Barbara Kent won the Miss Hollywood Beauty Pageant.

Career
Barbara Cloutman was born on December 16, 1907 in Gadsby, Alberta, Canada, to Lily Louise Kent and Jullion Curtis Cloutman. In 1925, she graduated from Hollywood High School and went on to win the Miss Hollywood Pageant. It was also the year in which she began her Hollywood career with a small role for Universal Studios, which signed her to a contract. A petite brunette who stood less than five feet tall, Kent became popular as a comedian opposite such stars as Reginald Denny. She made a strong impression as the heroine pitted against Greta Garbo's femme fatale in Flesh and the Devil in 1926 after Universal had lent the actress to MGM to make the film.

Kent then attracted the attention of audiences and censors in the 1927 production No Man's Law by appearing to swim nude. She actually wore a flesh-colored moleskin bathing suit in scenes that were considered very daring at the time. The popularity of that film led to her selection as one of the WAMPAS Baby Stars for 1927. She made a smooth transition into talking pictures opposite Harold Lloyd in the 1929 comedy Welcome Danger. Kent was also featured with Lloyd in his iconic Feet First. Over the next few years, she remained popular and received critical praise in 1933 for her role in the film version of Oliver Twist.

Kent married talent agent Harry Edington in Yuma, Arizona, on December 16, 1932 — her 25th birthday. During a one-year hiatus, Edington groomed Kent for what he intended to be a high-profile career. By the time she returned to films, however, her popularity had waned and she was unable to reestablish herself. She made her last appearance on screen in 1935.

Later years
Following the death of her husband Harry in 1949, Kent retreated from public life. She did, though, marry again in 1954, then to Jack Monroe, an engineer. The couple resided initially in Sun Valley, Idaho but later relocated to Palm Desert, California. There Kent lived until her death, at the age of 103, on October 13, 2011.

Hobbies
Kent had a great love for the outdoors. Always active, she enjoyed golf, fly fishing, hunting, and gardening. She was a longtime member of Marakkesh, Sunland, and Thunderbird Country Clubs. She was known as a talented cook and loved entertaining friends and family. Kent continued to fly light aircraft until her 85th birthday and was still playing golf well into her mid-90s.

Filmography

 Flesh and the Devil (1926)
 Prowlers of the Night (1926)
 The Peace Deputy (1927, short)
 The Lone Eagle (1927)
 No Man's Law (1927)
 The Small Bachelor (1927)
 The Drop Kick (1927)
 Modern Mothers (1928)
 Stop That Man! (1928)
 That's My Daddy (1928)
 His Destiny (1928)
 Lonesome (1928)
 Welcome Danger (1929)
 The Shakedown (1929)
 Night Ride (1930)
 Dumbbells in Ermine (1930)
 Feet First (1930)
 What Men Want (1930)
 Freighters of Destiny (1931)
 Chinatown After Dark (1931)
 Grief Street (1931)
 Indiscreet (1931)
 Self Defense (1932)
 Emma (1932)
 The Pride of the Legion (1932)
 No Living Witness (1932)
 Beauty Parlor (1932)
 Vanity Fair (1932)
 Exposed (1932)
 Marriage on Approval (1933)
 Her Forgotten Past (1933)
 Oliver Twist (1933)
 Swellhead (1935)
 Guard That Girl (1935)
Old Man Rhythm (1935) 
 Under Age (1941)

References

Further reading

External links

 
 
 Indiscreet (1931) profile at Internet Archive; starred Gloria Swanson, Monroe Owsley, and Kent
 Barbara Kent at Virtual History
  featuring Barbara Kent swimming

1907 births
2011 deaths
Actresses from Alberta
American centenarians
American film actresses
American silent film actresses
Canadian centenarians
Canadian film actresses
Canadian silent film actresses
Canadian emigrants to the United States
People from the County of Stettler No. 6
People from Palm Desert, California
Hollywood High School alumni
20th-century American actresses
20th-century Canadian actresses
WAMPAS Baby Stars
Women centenarians
21st-century American women
People from Sun Valley, Idaho